Watercress or yellowcress (Nasturtium officinale) is a species of aquatic flowering plant in the cabbage family Brassicaceae.

Watercress is a  rapidly growing perennial plant native to Europe and Asia. It is one of the oldest known leaf vegetables consumed by humans. Watercress and many of its relatives, such as garden cress, mustard, radish, and wasabi, are noteworthy for their piquant flavors.

The hollow stems of watercress float in water. The leaf structure is pinnately compound. Small, white, and green inflorescences are produced in clusters and are frequently visited by insects, especially hoverflies, such as Eristalis flies.

Taxonomy
Watercress is listed in some sources as belonging to the genus Rorippa, although molecular evidence shows those aquatic species with hollow stems are more closely related to Cardamine than Rorippa. Despite the Latin name, watercress is not particularly closely related to the flowers popularly known as nasturtiums (Tropaeolum majus). T. majus belongs to the family Tropaeolaceae, a sister taxon to the Brassicaceae within the order Brassicales.

Distribution 
In some regions, watercress is regarded as a weed, in other regions as an aquatic vegetable or herb. Watercress has grown in many locations around the world.

In the United Kingdom, watercress was first commercially cultivated in 1808 by the horticulturist William Bradbery along the River Ebbsfleet in Kent. Watercress is now grown in several counties of the United Kingdom, most notably Hampshire, Dorset, Wiltshire, and Hertfordshire. The town of Alresford, near Winchester, is considered to be the nation's watercress capital. It holds a Watercress Festival that brings in more than 15,000 visitors every year and a preserved steam railway line has been named after the local crop.

Uses 
Watercress leaves, stems, and fruit can be eaten raw.

Tradition 
Ancient Romans thought eating it would cure mental illness. Twelfth-century mystic Hildegard of Bingen thought eating it steamed and drinking the water would cure jaundice or fever. Watercress was eaten by Native Americans. Some Native Americans used it to treat kidney illnesses and constipation, and it was thought by some to be an aphrodisiac. Early African Americans used the plant as an abortifacient; it was believed to cause sterility as well.

Nutrition

The new tips of watercress leaves can be eaten raw or cooked, although caution should be used when collecting these in the wild because of parasites such as giardia. Watercress is 95% water and has low contents of carbohydrates, protein, fat, and dietary fiber. A 100-gram serving of raw watercress provides , is particularly rich in vitamin K (238% of the Daily Value, DV), and contains significant amounts of vitamin A, vitamin C, riboflavin, vitamin B6, calcium, and manganese (table).

Phytochemicals and cooking
As a cruciferous vegetable, watercress contains isothiocyanates that are partly destroyed by boiling, while the content of carotenoids is slightly increased. Steaming or microwave cooking retains these phytochemicals.

Cultivation

Watercress cultivation is practical on both a large scale and a garden scale. Being semi-aquatic, watercress is well-suited to hydroponic cultivation, thriving best in water that is slightly alkaline. It is frequently produced around the headwaters of chalk streams. In many local markets, the demand for hydroponically grown watercress exceeds supply, partly because cress leaves are unsuitable for distribution in dried form and can only be stored fresh for about 2–3 days.

Also sold as sprouts, the edible shoots are harvested days after germination.

Concerns
Watercress crops grown in the presence of manure can be an environment for parasites such as the liver fluke, Fasciola hepatica. By inhibiting the cytochrome P450 enzyme CYP2E1, compounds in watercress may alter drug metabolism in individuals on certain medications such as chlorzoxazone.

Due to its fast-growing nature and invasive species status, Nasturtium officinale is prohibited in Illinois.

See also
 Fool's watercress – Apium nodiflorum
 Garden cress
 List of vegetables
 Watercress soup

References

External links

 Rorippa nasturtium-aquaticum (ITIS)
 GLANSIS Species Fact Sheet

Asian vegetables
Nasturtium (genus)
Freshwater plants
Herbs
Leaf vegetables
Medicinal plants
Perennial vegetables
Flora of Europe
Flora of temperate Asia